KTUI-FM 102.1 FM is a radio station in Sullivan, Missouri and licensed to Meramec Area Broadcasting LLC.

KTUI-FM and sister station KTUI were purchased by Fidelity Broadcasting in 1997. On March 9, 2008, KTUI 100.9 FM switched frequencies to 102.1 FM. The radio stations' coverage areas in Missouri reach from St. James on the west to Pacific on the east, and New Haven on the north to Potosi on the south, covering several hundred square miles around the state. The FM station plays a mix of new and old country music, while the AM station enlightens listeners with talk radio.

Effective March 31, 2020, Fidelity Broadcasting sold KTUI-FM and KTUI to Meramec Area Broadcasting LLC for $200,000.

KTUI-FM is a member of the St. Louis Cardinals Radio Network.

References

External links

TUI
Country radio stations in the United States